David Christopher Ward (born 20 July 1981) is a former Australian-born English cricketer.  Ward was a right-handed batsman who bowled right-arm medium pace.  He was born at Brisbane, Queensland.

Ward represented the Derbyshire Cricket Board in two List A cricket matches. These came against Wales Minor Counties in the 1999 NatWest Trophy and the Gloucestershire Cricket Board in the 2000 NatWest Trophy.  In his 2 List A matches, he scored 23 with a high score of 22*.  With the ball he took 4 wickets at a bowling average of 19.50, with best figures of 2/31.

Family
His father Alan played Test cricket for England as well as first-class cricket for Derbyshire and Leicestershire.

References

External links

1981 births
Cricketers from Brisbane
British people of Australian descent
English cricketers
Derbyshire Cricket Board cricketers
Living people
English cricketers of 1969 to 2000